Solok Equator Luak 50 Kota Football Club or SEL 50 Kota FC is an Indonesian football club based in 50 Kota, West Sumatra. They currently compete in the Liga 3 and their homebase is Singo Harau Stadium. They formed after the Liga 3 club from Solok, Solok FC, merging with local club from 50 Kota, Equator Luak 50 Kota.

References

Football clubs in Indonesia
Football clubs in West Sumatra
Association football clubs established in 2019
2019 establishments in Indonesia